Del Mar High School (DMHS) is a four-year, public secondary school established in 1959 in San Jose, California. It is part of the Campbell Union High School District, (CUHSD), the other schools in which are Branham, Leigh, Prospect, and Westmont.  Most of Del Mar’s students come from the Campbell Union School District’s Monroe Middle School. The school serves both San Jose and Campbell, in addition to some unincorporated pockets of Santa Clara County. In 2016, Del Mar became an International Baccalaureate school. The first class who started the diploma, was the class of 2018.

The school mascot of Del Mar is "The Don," and the colors are black, gold, and, officially, white. As of 2012 the school principal is Larry Lopez. In recent years, the school's academic scores have risen significantly, most notably by reaching an API (Academic Performance Index) score of 720 in 2011, a jump of 122 points since 2004.  In 2007, it was officially deemed a “California Distinguished School.”

History 
The CUHSD began construction on the Del Mar campus in 1957; it was established in 1959. The first school year began in September 1959 with the first class graduating in June 1960. Del Mar was the first complete four year high school in California to be constructed by the state's aid building fund, at a cost of $3 million. The dedication of the new school was attended by California Governor Edmund G. "Pat" Brown.

The school was also the first of any high school in the state to boast a sunken football stadium; the stadium came about as part of an agreement between the school district and Count Allesandro Dandini, the owner of a brick-making plant which was adjacent to the football field.  The stadium area was cleared out in exchange for the clay which was excavated. In 2007, the grass field and dirt track were replaced with an artificial turf field and tartan track in time for football season.

The superintendent of the CUHSD at the time of the school's construction in 1957, Larry Hill, made a deal to get the 'clinker' bricks from the yard at a discount, to use in the schools the district was building at the time. As a result, all of Del Mar's original buildings have a great deal of brick in them.

Athletics and extracurricular activities 
Del Mar’s main athletic rivals are often Branham, Prospect, Westmont or Leigh, since they are sister schools in the Campbell Union High School District.  This varies between sports and changes from year to year, however.

Sports 
Del Mar sports teams compete in the Blossom Valley Athletic League, divisions of which are ‘A league’: Mount Hamilton Division, ‘B league’: Santa Teresa Division, and ‘C league’: West Valley Division. BVAL falls in California’s Central Coast Section, known as CCS.  The school's sport program includes football, soccer, basketball, cross country, volleyball, field hockey, tennis, golf, wrestling, baseball, softball, badminton, swimming & diving, and track & field.

Del Mar sports teams have won many League and CCS championships over the course of the school's history - the banners commemorating those titles hang in the school's big gym.  In the 2005-2006 school year, several teams won the title of League Champions, including football, JV boys' soccer, badminton, and girls' swimming. The 2006-2007 season was no different, as boys' basketball won the league, as did the ladies soccer team, who went on to CCS. In the spring of 2007, the track & field team sent the first relay team to CCS in 10 years, but fell short of winning league to Andrew Hill. Field hockey has won league titles in 2001-2002 and 2008-2009, 2009-2010, 2010-2011. In fall 2007, the football team made history by going 10-0, a feat that has never accomplished in the school's history, and also was able to host the first round of CCS Playoffs at home for the first time in 11 years. In 2007-2008 Del Mar's track team won the League championship going a perfect 7-0 in League. In 2009, the girls basketball team won a school-record 21 games and made it to the second round of CCS playoffs. Girls basketball is the most consistent team, in terms of reaching the playoffs. 

Del Mar's Football team won the 2010 league championship with a 7-3 record, which was a huge turn around from the 1-9 record the previous season. Del Mar repeated as the 2011 West Valley Division Football Champs with a league record of 7-3. This was the first time Del Mar won back to back league championships in football since the 90-91 teams.

Performing arts 
Del Mar’s marching band is officially named the Del Mar High School Marching Band.  In the fall, they host the annual Feste Del Mar Band Review, which holds competitions for Concert, Jazz, and Marching bands, and is known in the NCBA (Northern California Band Association) circuit for its hospitality.  Del Mar routinely sends musicians to the Northern California Honor Band, and the All-State Honor Band.  Fall season Marching Band was a class until 2016 when it officially became an extra-curricular sport, rehearsing Tuesday and Thursday nights from 6 to 9 pm and Saturdays from 9 am to 5 pm. Meanwhile, the class became solely dedicated to Symphonic band performance.

In the winter season, Del Mar fields a WinterGuard and Winter Percussion, which both practice Tuesday and Thursday nights.  They have competed as part of CCGC, and NCBA. Del Mar also has a fairly successful Choir class, with plans to travel to Dublin in June 2018. Orchestra has also become an outside-school activity due to low enrollment.

Drama 1 and Drama 2, and occasionally Drama 3, classes are offered at Del Mar. There is a play produced every November and a musical produced every February, as well as a faculty musical every April. All productions are usually directed and produced by the chair of the performing arts department.

Past shows include 'Charlie Brown,' 'Twilight of the Golds,' 'Hamlet II,' ‘The Actor’s Nightmare,’ 'Thoroughly Modern Millie,' ‘Little Shop of Horrors,’ ‘Once Upon a Mattress,’ ‘Aida,’ ‘42nd Street,’ ‘A Funny Thing Happened on the way to the Forum,’ 'Don't Drink the Water,' 'Cinderella,' 'Girl Crazy,' ‘Grease,’ 'Guys & Dolls,' and others. The most recent musical productions have been 'Bells are Ringing' in 2018, 'Into the Woods' in 2017, and 'The Drowsy Chaperone' in 2016. The most recent plays include 'Much Ado About Nothing', 'The Real Inspector Hound', and 'Barefoot in the Park'.

Publications 
The DMHS newspaper is called the Perspective, and is produced by the Journalism class.  The Perspective’s website is www.dmhsperspective.com.  The first newspaper at Del Mar, published in 1962, three years after the school opened, was called the Excelsior. The Galleon became the name in 1966, and The Dawning replaced that in 1983. The newspaper assumed its current name in a "Name the Newspaper" contest in 1993, although the full original name was From the Don's Perspective. As of August 2011 the newspaper is entirely online with the exception of the printed Senior Magazine. The Perspective has a Facebook page and a Twitter.

The yearbook class puts together the yearbook, called the Laurel.

ASB 
Del Mar’s ASB meets at 7:30 in the ASB room every day, and is in charge of organizing activities, rallies, and dances.  This includes Spirit Week, before Homecoming, Class Olympics, and assorted dances throughout the year, including Kickoff, Homecoming, Blackout, and Prom.  There is an ASB President, VP, Secretary, and Treasurer, and then the same for each grade level.  Elections are held near the end of each year for the next year’s officers.  An ASB card will get students into various events either for free (sports games), or for a reduced price (dances and performances).  They can be purchased with a yearbook at the beginning of the year for around $90.

Clubs 
Several of the above-mentioned associations are considered ‘clubs,’ but the list of the more traditional meet-during-lunch clubs on campus includes C.S.F. (California Scholarship Federation), Photo Club, International Club, Key Club, Juventud Latina, GSA (Gay Straight Alliance), Uprising, and Ecology Club.  Del Mar also has a Spirit squad.

School information

Courses 
Del Mar High School does not offer "Honors" courses.  However, Freshman and Sophomore students can choose to take "ICAP" classes.  These classes specifically prepare students to IB classes in their Junior and Senior years.  Del Mar High School officially became an IB in 2016.  Students still have the option of taking AP U.S. Government and Politics, AP Computer Science Principles, and AP Calculus AB in addition to the IB courses offered.

Grading 
Del Mar operates on a normal A through F system, with minor variation among teachers on which percentages correspond to which letter grades.  Progress reports are sent home every six weeks, and final grades at the end of each semester, of which there are two.  Finals for the first semester generally fall on or around January 29, and second semester finals are around June 14, with seniors’ generally the week earlier.

Schedule 
Del Mar, along with the rest of the CUHSD, is on a block schedule, with periods 1-3 on Gold days, 4-6 on Black days, zero period every day, and seventh period every day except Wednesday.  This gives teachers longer uninterrupted class periods to work with.

For the 2009-2010 school year, Del Mar's faculty voted on a new class schedule. This schedule would consist of a tutorial period in the middle of the day named "PLUS PERIOD." Furthermore, freshman who are not enrolled in Honors classes will follow a Learning Community program. This is an attempt to remedy past failures in increasing exam scores.

Del Mar also has "collaboration days" when seventh period doesn’t meet, and school ends at 1:15.  There are also minimum days at the end of each grading period, (every six weeks), when regular classes get out at 12:25, seventh period at 1:00.  Finals are given in 120 minute blocks and the day ends at 12:20.

Six classes is a normal course load.

Tools 
Del Mar, along with the rest of the Campbell Union High School District, is set up for teachers to electronically enter their students’ grades on AERIES, a program that then allows students and parents to check their grades online.  Also, Del Mar is on SchoolLoop, a program that allows teachers to post homework assignments, test dates, and notes online, in addition to providing the opportunity to communicate with their students by email.

Community 
Parent associations/Booster clubs at Del Mar include the Dons Club, PTA, Padres Unidos, and the Performing Arts Association.  Membership in the Dons Club includes discounts to get into most athletic events that charge admission.

Faculty 
The administration/staff for Del Mar High School includes principal Larry Lopez, assistant principals Diana Nguyen, Juan Gonzalez and Lindsay Pebworth, counselors Evelyn Beas, Kristie Geist and Richard Mendoza, activities director Courtney Van Benthuysen, and athletics director Ryan Castaneda.  A great number of the teachers at Del Mar have been hired in the last three years.  Del Mar has young Staff and Coaches in charge of some of the sports teams and students in charge of the newspaper, and yearbook.

Students 
West Valley is a popular community college among Del Mar students, and many Del Mar students have gone on to colleges and universities in the UC and CSU systems, as well as private schools such as Santa Clara University, Pacific University, Northwestern, and Stanford.

Several school awards are presented at graduation, including the Principal's Cup, the Laurance J. Hill Award, and the titles of valedictorian and salutatorian. Laurance Hill was a principal of the old Campbell High School, and played an important role in the expansion of the CUHSD district. An award in his name is given out to those with good grades and high involvement in school, especially in community service.

Campus 
Del Mar’s original wings on the north side of the quad, in addition to the band and drama rooms, the cafeteria/stage end of the building, the main office, teacher’s lounge, library, and student services center are all original buildings in Del Mar’s traditional brick.  Many of these wings have been refurbished in the past several years, or are in the process of being redone.

In what used to be the senior parking lot stands the new science wing, complete with solar panels on the roof that feed back into the power grid, after serving the science wing itself.  It contains six classrooms, providing physics, chemistry, biology, and integrated science classes with high ceilings, projectors, and, in room 74, a balcony.

The large and small gyms, locker rooms, and swimming pool, on the south side of the quad, are also original.  The big gym, home to basketball, volleyball, badminton, and several families of small birds which build nests in the old lights in the ceiling, received a new paint job in 2006 courtesy of the Don's Club.  The pool deck has two pools, the 12-foot diving well and the 6-lane pool, which is 3.5 feet at the ends and 4 in the middle.  Water polo cannot be played at Del Mar because of the pool's depth, or lack thereof.  There are seven tennis courts, four outdoor basketball courts, two sand volleyball courts that are rarely used, the weight room, a football practice field, a baseball diamond, three softball/baseball fields, and a large field that houses soccer.  There is also the Bowl, housing the brand new artificial-turf athletic field and appropriately new rubber track which is used for field hockey, soccer, and football.

The Del Mar campus is also home to a Metropolitan Adult Education Program center.

Notable alumni 
Notable alumni of Del Mar High School include:
 Jennifer Granholm, Governor of Michigan and Television commentator
 Reza Aslan, Iranian-American writer, scholar of religious studies and a professor
 Adrienne Barbeau, television and film star. 
 Antonio Esfandiari, Professional poker player
 Keith Kelly, judge of the Utah Third District Court in Salt Lake City
 Mark McNamara, played in 8 NBA seasons for the 76ers, San Antonio Spurs, Kansas City Kings, Los Angeles Lakers and Orlando Magic.
 Gary Radnich (Radunich), sports anchor on KRON 4 (TV) and sportscaster on KNBR 680 (Radio). Gary Radnich attended Del Mar, but transferred to Branham High his senior year.
 Jeff Toews, former NFL offensive tackle and guard with the Miami Dolphins.
 Loren Toews, NFL player for the Pittsburgh Steelers.  Four-time Super Bowl winner. 
 Dick Vermeil, head football coach of UCLA and the Kansas City Chiefs began his teaching career at Del Mar High School in September 1959.
 Ryan Wieber, Emmy award-winning professional compositor
 Desirée Goyette, A two-time Grammy nominee. Character voice credits include: Betty Boop, Barbie, Nermal, Petunia Pig, Honey Bunny, and numerous others for radio, television and toys.

See also
 Corona del Mar High School
 Del Oro High School

References

External links 
 Del Mar High School (official website)
 Del Mar High School Community Group (community/parent website)
 DMHS Perspective (online newspaper)

Campbell Union High School District
High schools in San Jose, California
Educational institutions established in 1959
Public high schools in California
1959 establishments in California